Rothienorman railway station, Rothie or Rothie Norman was a railway station in Rothienorman, Aberdeenshire on the rural branchline to Macduff. The station served the village and the nearby Rothie Norman House and estate.

History and infrastructure
The station was known as 'Rothie' from 1857 to 1870 and 'Rothie Norman' from 1870 to 1951. The signal box was opened on 24 December 1894 and closed on 11 December 1961 but remained for a further year as a level crossing gate box. The station had two platforms connected by a pedestrian overbridge with a passing loop. A small wooden shelter stood on the up platform as did the signal box and the level crossing over a minor road to the south.

The main station buildings, typical of other stations on the line, stood on the down platform on the same side as the village. Several sidings and a goods shed stood to the south of the level crossing on the down side of the passing loop. Another siding lay to the north of the down platform end. The goods yard had a weighing machine and a crane with a  lift. Passenger services were withdrawn after 30 September 1951. The line closed to goods on 3 January 1966.

Present condition 
The station buildings and platform have been demolished and a primary school car park sits on the site.

Previous services 
All passenger trains stopped at the station.

References

Notes

Sources 
 
 
 McLeish, Duncan (2014). Rails to Banff, Macduff and Oldmeldrum. Pub. GNoSRA. .
 RAILSCOT on Banff, Macduff and Turriff Junction Railway

Disused railway stations in Aberdeenshire
Former Great North of Scotland Railway stations
Railway stations in Great Britain opened in 1857
Railway stations in Great Britain closed in 1951
1857 establishments in Scotland
1951 disestablishments in Scotland